The 1928–29 FAW Welsh Cup is the 48th season of the annual knockout tournament for competitive football teams in Wales.

Key
League name pointed after clubs name.
B&DL - Birmingham & District League
CCL - Cheshire County League
FL D1 - Football League First Division
FL D3N - Football League Third Division North
FL D3S - Football League Third Division South
SFL - Southern Football League
WLN - Welsh League North
WLS - Welsh League South

Third round

Fourth round

Fifth round
Eight winners from the Fourth round and eight new clubs.

Sixth round

Semifinal
Both semifinals were held at Rhyl.

Final
Final were held at Shrewsbury, replay - at Wrexham.

External links
The FAW Welsh Cup

1928-29
Wales
Cup